European Top 20 was a disk magazine and scene chart for the Commodore Amiga published by the demo scene group Equinox. The first issue was published in July 1992 and the last (number 7) in July 1993.

References

External links 
Download all European Top 20 issues

Commodore International
Defunct computer magazines
Disk magazines
Magazines established in 1992
Magazines disestablished in 1993